Red Blood and Blue is a 1925 American silent Western film directed by James C. Hutchinson and starring Guinn 'Big Boy' Williams, Peggy O'Day, and Frank Baker.

Plot
As described in a film magazine review, Tom Butler becomes an outcast when he displeases his father. He goes West and, while convalescing from a broken ankle, he is told to guard certificates for valuable stock. The rival gang, however, gets possession of the certificates. Tom is suspected. He rides away when the Sheriff’s posse arrives and captures the crooks in their cabin and recovers the certificates.

Cast
 Guinn 'Big Boy' Williams as Tom Butler 
 Peggy O'Day as Leona Lane
 John Barley as Dave Butler
 Fred J. Butler as Jim Lane
 Frank Baker as Bill Gronn
 Irvin Woffard as Pete Smith
 Oliver Drake as Slim

References

Bibliography
 Langman, Larry. A Guide to Silent Westerns. Greenwood Publishing Group, 1992.

External links
 

1925 films
1925 Western (genre) films
American black-and-white films
Silent American Western (genre) films
1920s English-language films
1920s American films